This is a list of prototype vehicles created by Bugatti that never reached full production.

Type 36
The Type 36 racer was produced in 1925, and introduced a new 1.5 L (1493 cc/91 in³) straight-8 engine.  With a 60 by 66 mm bore and stroke, the engine later found a place in the Type 39A, though the Type 36 project was more of an experiment.  At first, the rear axle was bolted directly to the frame with no springs.  In 1926, Bugatti added both springs and a supercharger to the Type 36.  This was the experimental base for the Type 35C.

Type 45
The  16-cylinder Type 45 racing car and similar Type 47 "Grand Sport" were to become a new generation of cars from Bugatti. The engine, a 3-valve SOHC design, was based on the 3-valve straight-8 from the Type 35. Two versions were made:  A 3.0 L (2986 cc/182 in³) version fitted to a Type 47 prototype shared the Type 36's 60 by 66 mm dimensions, while the Type 45 prototype used a unique 84 mm stroke for 3.8 L (3801 cc/231 in³). Output would have been 200 to 250 hp (149 to 186 kW) with a Roots-type supercharger in play.

The entire vehicle was unique, including its chassis.  The Type 45 used a 102.2 in (2596 mm) wheelbase, while the Type 47 was stretched to 108.3 in (2750 mm).  Both had a 49.2 in (1250 mm) track.

Type 56
The Type 56 was an electric vehicle. The number built is controversial; six seems the most likely answer.

The Bugatti 56 was originally designed for private use by Ettore Bugatti as a factory runabout, but due to popular demand from previous customers convinced him to build some extra types 56.

The Type 56 was a tiny 2-seat open car very much in the style of turn-of-the-century horseless carriages or voiturettes. Power came from a single 28 amp electric motor producing 1 hp (0.8 kW). Energy was stored in six 6 volt accumulators in series for a total of 36 volts. The motor was mounted directly to the frame and drove the rear wheels through gears. Electric braking was allowed, and both hand- and foot-brakes operated on rear wheel drums. Four forward speeds were available, and the vehicle could accelerate to 28 km/h (17.4 mph). Steering was by tiller.

Ettore Bugatti's personal 56 is part of the collection at the Musée National de l'Automobile de Mulhouse.

Type 64
The Bugatti Type 64 was an Atlantic-style coupe produced in 1939 with papillon [French for "butterfly"] doors, designed by Jean Bugatti. It was fitted with a 4.4 L (4432 cc/270 in³) 2-valve DOHC straight-8 engine and rode on a 130 in (3300 mm) wheelbase. Three cars were started, but only one body was finished before Jean Bugatti's death in 1939; a second was completed in 2012.

Type 73C
Begun in 1943 and completed in 1947 after the war, the Type 73C was to be a comeback for Bugatti. But the death of Ettore Bugatti in August of that year doomed the project. An engine-less Type 73 was shown at the 1947 Paris Motor Show two months later. Although five 73C chassis had been constructed in Paris, Only one body was completed for these cars and at least three engines and one complete car were assembled and tested by the factory. Serge Pozzoli stated that he visited the Bugatti factory at Rue Debarcadere in Paris where he saw a demonstration car which was fitted with a scaled down body similar to the pre-war Type 50BIII (Cork Car). All the cars were dismantled and taken to Molsheim after Ettore Bugatti's death.

The Type 73C used a new 1.5 L (1488 cc/90 in³) straight-4 engine with 4 valves per cylinder and a twin overhead camshaft. This was a new design with a 76 mm bore and 95 mm stroke, wet cylinder liners, a detachable cylinder head, and a single cast iron exhaust manifold. Much to the chagrin of Bugatti purists, the Type 73 used off-the-shelf hex fasteners rather than the custom-designed parts used in all previous cars.

The five Type 73C chassis were sold off after the company exited automobile production. Most were later assembled, and one (number 2) was even given a body based on the original Bugatti drawings.

There are several prototype Type 73 Bugatti models.

Type 73:  Touring two- or four-seater; four-cylinder, twin overhead camshaft, four valves per cylinder

Type 73A: Touring two- or four-seater four-cylinder Single overhead camshaft with three valves per cylinder.

Type 73C: Grand Prix single seater: The engine fitted to this car is similar to the Type 73

Type 73B: touring two- or four-seater: Similar engine to the Type 73 but with single overhead camshaft.

Type 251
The final resurgence of the original Bugatti was the Type 251, completed in 1955. Designed by Gioacchino Colombo of Ferrari fame, it was powered by a new 2.5 L (2486 cc/151 in³) straight-8. Uniquely, this engine was mounted transversely, behind the driver. For the first time in a Bugatti, an oversquare engine was used with a 76 mm bore and 68.5 mm stroke. A de Dion tube rear suspension was also a novelty for the company, though it was in vogue at the time. The Type 251 was entered in the 1956 French Grand Prix, driven by Maurice Trintignant, but was not competitive and retired after 18 laps.

References

Prototypes
Bugatti concept vehicles